The Boys of Paul Street is a 1969 Hungarian drama film directed by Zoltán Fábri and based on the 1906 youth novel The Paul Street Boys by Ferenc Molnár. It was nominated for the Academy Award for Best Foreign Language Film. It features English-speaking (American and British) child actors (led by Anthony Kemp as Ernő Nemecsek) accompanied by Hungarian adult ones including Fábri's favorite actress Mari Törőcsik as Nemecsek's mother. Currently, it is acclaimed as the best and most faithful adaptation of Molnár's source novel and a classic film in Hungary.

Cast
 Mari Törőcsik as Nemecsek's mother
 Sándor Pécsi as teacher Rácz
 László Kozák as Janó
 Anthony Kemp as Ernő Nemecsek
 William Burleigh as Boka
 John Moulder-Brown as Geréb
 Robert Efford as Csónakos
 Mark Colleano as Csele
 Gary O'Brien as Weisz
 Martin Beaumont as Kolnay
 Paul Bartlett as Barabás
 Earl Younger as Leszik

See also
 The Paul Street Boys, a 1935 Italian film adaptation of the same novel
 List of submissions to the 41st Academy Awards for Best Foreign Language Film
 List of Hungarian submissions for the Academy Award for Best Foreign Language Film

References

External links

1960s Hungarian-language films
1969 films
Films based on Hungarian novels
Films based on works by Ferenc Molnár
Films directed by Zoltán Fábri
1969 drama films
Hungarian drama films
Films set in Budapest
20th Century Fox films